Centre Place Shopping Centre is a shopping mall in Hamilton, New Zealand. It is located in the suburb of Hamilton Central. Centre Place is one of the city's three major malls along with Te Awa at The Base and Westfield Chartwell.

A scheme for the former Hamilton Central station site was promoted in 1969, though the site was still an undeveloped car park in 1981. Development started in 1984 and Centreplace opened in 1985. In October 2013, an extension of Centre Place replaced the former Downtown Plaza.

References

External links

Official website

Shopping centres in New Zealand